The Museum of the Army (Spanish: Museo del Ejército) is a national museum located in Toledo, Spain,  attached to the Ministry of Defence. 

The collection was previously housed in Madrid, and the museum opened on its present site in 2010. It occupies two linked buildings, Toledo's historic Alcázar (castle) and a purpose-built extension.

History 
The history of the museum began in 1803 when the royal military museum was established in a building in Madrid known as the Palacio de Monteleón. The building also served as a barracks for artillery units and it was attacked and looted by the French when they suppressed the Dos de Mayo Uprising of 1808. The museum was reestablished, but in 1827 it was divided into two sections: the Museo de Artillería and the Museo de Ingenieros. Later the collections were unified and housed in the Hall of Realms.

In the twenty-first century the collections were moved from Madrid to Toledo. The new premises offered much more space, although the site was not without controversy because of its associations with the Siege of the Alcázar, an episode in the Spanish Civil War, when the castle was held by Nationalist forces. In the aftermath of the war, the ruins of the building became a propagandistic memorial to the Francoist victory. Yet still, the choice of content and the museographic treatment proved to be even more controversial.

The new museum was opened in 2010 by Felipe, Prince of Asturias.

The Alcázar
The Alcázar is used for the Permanent Exhibition. Some rooms are devoted to chronological displays reflecting the history of Spain twinned with that of its Army, other rooms show the collections thematically.

The new building

The new building houses the administrative offices, the Temporary Exhibitions room, the Army room in the present time, the didactic classroom, the auditorium, the archive, the library, the coffee shop, the restoration workshops and the warehouses, all of them endowed with the greatest technical advances for the conservation, restoration, cataloging, investigation and diffusion of the funds that are guarded.

Archaeology
Some items are archaeological. The displays include finds from excavations at the Alcázar which were undertaken prior to construction of the museum extension.

Display cases and individual items
Some of the display cases belonging to the museum are of interest in their own right with decorative details reflecting their contents.

The museum contains many miniature replicas of battles.

The displays on the 20th century include a 1930s Enigma machine in its original box. The Spanish have preserved a number of Enigma machines, modified versions of the commercial machine, which were obtained by Franco from Nazi Germany. In 1937, the British cryptographer Dilly Knox broke Franco's Enigma, but knowledge of this breakthrough was not shared with the Republicans. 
Two of the Spanish Enigma machines have been presented to British institutions in return for Enigma-related material.

Gallery

References

External links

Official website

Archaeological museums in Spain
Military and war museums in Spain
Museums in Toledo, Spain
2010 establishments in Spain
Armour collections
Enigma machine